Six business routes of Arkansas Highway 1 currently exist, with one spur route. Each of the routes is a former alignment of Arkansas Highway 1, which is common practice.

DeWitt business route

Arkansas Highway 1 Business is a business route in DeWitt.

Major intersections

St. Charles spur

Arkansas Highway 1 Spur is a spur route in St. Charles. The highway ends at the location of the Battle of Saint Charles on the White River.

Major intersections

Marianna business route

Highway 1 Business is a business route in Marianna.

Major intersections

Forrest City business route

Arkansas Highway 1 Business is a business route in Forrest City. The highway runs near Forrest City High School.

Major intersections

Vanndale business route

Arkansas Highway 1B is a business route (formerly signed as AR 1C, a city route) in Vanndale.

Major intersections

Cherry Valley business route

Arkansas Highway 1 Business is a business route in Cherry Valley.

Major intersections

Jonesboro business route

Arkansas Highway 1 Business is a business route serving downtown Jonesboro.

Major intersections

References

001
Transportation in Arkansas County, Arkansas
Transportation in Lee County, Arkansas
Transportation in St. Francis County, Arkansas
Transportation in Cross County, Arkansas
Transportation in Craighead County, Arkansas